Lee Yoon-sang (born 11 May 1968), known professionally as Yoon Sang, is a South Korean composer, record producer, singer and songwriter. He currently serves as a contemporary music professor at Sungshin Women's University.

Music career
Lee began his musical career as a bassist in a band supporting pop singer Kim Wan-sun. He received an offer for a solo debut from Kim Kwangsoo, now head of MBK Entertainment, in 1990 and released an album incorporating synthpop elements entitled Vol.1 to commercial success.Vol.1 was followed with Vol.2 Part 1 in 1992 and Vol.2 Part 2 in 1993. Vol.2 was the more avant-garde and experimental of the two albums but still found commercial success. The title song, "가려진 시간 사이로 (Between The Hidden Time / Between the Veiled Times)" was especially popular.

Lee's third album release, Renacimiento in 1996, consists of remakes of songs from his previous albums sung by French, Italian and American vocals with redone lyrics. Renacimiento was one of the first mainstream albums in Korea incorporating the world music genre and was also popular. Yoon Sang also released a techno album entitled Golden Hits as part of the music collaborative project "NoDance" with rock artist Shin Hae-chul.

After releasing 移徙 이사 (Migration) in 2002 Yoon Sang worked on composing and lyric-writing for SM Entertainment, penning songs for BoA and TVXQ, among other artists. In 2003 he released There Is A Man..., his fifth album, which incorporated rap, Latin, and electronic dance music. A track from that album entitled "길은 계속된다 (The road continues)" also incorporated glitch music. In 2008, Lee released a tribute album called YOONSANG SONGBOOK : Play With Him! with covers by many Korean groups, including electronic duo Peppertones and rock band My Aunt Mary (마이앤트메리).

In 2009 Lee released an eponymous glitch-focused album as part of project group called "mo:tet (모텟)" with fellow Korean musicians Kayip and Superdrive. The group was formed while Lee spent two semesters at the NYU School of Music Technology. Both Kayip (카입) and Superdrive (슈퍼드라이브) were experienced with electronic and IDM-focused music and Lee wanted to expand awareness of these types of music domestically. They finished producing the record by sending files over email and MySpace and held a showcase for the album at Hongik University.

In 2015 Yoon Sang participated in the Infinite Challenge Music Festival and was partnered with cast member Jeong Jun-ha.

In 2019 he was a judge in the JTBC talent show Superband.

In 2022 Yoon made his debut as a music director with the Film Twisted House. Later in July, Yoon has been confirmed to join the music program Sing in the Green.

Discography

References

External links

Korean Esperantists
1968 births
Living people
South Korean electronic musicians
South Korean techno musicians
South Korean record producers
South Korean pianists
South Korean radio presenters
South Korean television personalities
Musicians from Seoul
Berklee College of Music alumni
New York University alumni
Kyung Hee University alumni
Male pianists
21st-century pianists
21st-century South Korean male singers
South Korean male singer-songwriters
20th-century South Korean male singers